Ercan International Airport  is the primary civilian airport of the unrecognised de facto state of Northern Cyprus.

History

The precursor of Ercan Airport, Tymvou Airport, was constructed by the British in World War II as a military airport, during their colonial rule of the island. Following the Turkish invasion of Cyprus and the partition of the island it was occupied by the Turkish army, and today it is used as the main civilian airport of Northern Cyprus.

Since 2006, the rule which stipulates that flights are required to touch down at a Turkish airport before continuing to and from Ercan has been under discussion. In 2006, the Turkish government began discussions for Northern Cyprus's main port Famagusta, and main civilian airport Ercan, to be able to operate direct connections, with the UK government describing it as a "significant and creative offer".

However, as of 2017, the rule still applies, and Ercan airport has seen a decrease in customers, as a result of new tight security measures imposed by the UK Department for Transport questioning the status of the airport and forcing passengers travelling between Britain and Northern Cyprus to disembark with their luggage and go through a fresh security check in Turkey in order to board a new aircraft for their final destination.

Recent plans have arisen to privatise Ercan Airport, as well as plans to enlarge the airport in order to increase capacity. Ercan Airport currently has a 2.75 kilometre-long runway and an apron with a capacity of seven aircraft. Although the runway is long enough for large planes to land, it is not long enough for take-offs. The plan has been for the construction of a new runway of 3200m and extension of the existing runway to 3200m, apron and terminal building and with the planned new apron more than doubling the current plane capacity. As of 2021, the new terminal is currently under construction. It will be much larger than the existing and have 9 airbridges.

The new terminal was due to open on 15 November 2022 but the opening has been delayed. It will be fully compliant with international standards and will be able to handle direct flights in the future.

Airlines and destinations
Flights to the airport are banned internationally due to the ongoing Cyprus dispute. Non-stop flights only take place from Turkey, and all planes that fly to Northern Cyprus from other countries have to stop over in Turkey. Because of these difficulties and inconveniences, the majority of Turkish Cypriots with Republic of Cyprus passports prefer to use Larnaca International Airport, which is located in the territory under the control of the internationally recognised government of the Republic of Cyprus; this option is not available, however, to the Turkish citizens. However, several Turkish airlines operate direct flights from Ercan to Europe with intermediate stops in Turkey via some of the destinations listed below.
The Government of the Republic of Cyprus considers the use of Ercan Airport to exit or enter the island illegal.

Statistics

References

External links

 
 
 

Airports in Northern Cyprus
Airports in Cyprus
World War II airfields in Cyprus
Nicosia